A. Mani (died 11 July 1996) was elected to the Tamil Nadu Legislative Assembly from the Nellikuppam constituency in the 1996 elections. He was a candidate of the Dravida Munnetra Kazhagam (DMK) party.

Mani died on 11 July 1996.

References 

Year of birth missing
1996 deaths
Tamil Nadu MLAs 1996–2001
Dravida Munnetra Kazhagam politicians